Jan-Michael Peters (born 16 August 1962 in Schleswig-Holstein, Germany) is a cell- and molecular biologist. Since 2013, he is Scientific Director of the Research Institute of Molecular Pathology (IMP) in Vienna.

Early life and education
Jan-Michael Peters grew up in Schleswig-Holstein and referred to an interest in biology that goes back to his childhood.

Peters started studying at the University of Kiel in 1982, where he received his pre-diploma in Biology. In 1988, he completed his diploma studies at the University of Heidelberg, where he also obtained his PhD in cell biology in 1991. Working with Werner Franke during his PhD studies, Peters discovered p97-ATPase and first characterized the 26S proteasome.

Career and research
Between 1992 and 1993, Peters continued working with Werner W. Franke as a postdoctoral fellow at the German Cancer Research Center DKFZ in Heidelberg, where he worked on the first purification and electron microscopy of 26S proteasome.

In 1994, Peters joined the lab of Marc W. Kirschner at Harvard Medical School in Boston as a postdoctoral fellow. There, he discovered the anaphase promoting complex/cyclosome (APC/C) and other enzymes required for chromosome segregation.

In 1996, Peters moved to Vienna to become Junior Group Leader at the Research Institute of Molecular Pathology (IMP), and was promoted to Senior Scientist in 2002. In 2011, he became the institute's Scientific Deputy Director and in 2013 Scientific Director, succeeding Barry Dickson.

Peters’ research group studies the molecular mechanisms of chromosome organization, chromosome segregation and cell division in a variety of model organisms.

Peters characterized the regulation and operating principle of a number of proteins that are responsible for the correct chromosome segregation during mitosis. Using the enzyme Polo-like Kinase 1 (Pik1), Peters characterized a cell division enzyme that has shown to be a promising target for chemotherapy against certain cancers.

Peters was the coordinator of the European Science Foundation network grant EuroDYNA (2005-2008) that is fostering interaction among various collaborative research projects. He contributed to this program when he discovered the relationship between two proteins, cohesin and CTCF, in regulating the expression and transcription of genes.

Between 2004 and 2009, Peters also coordinated the EU funded research project MitoCheck, aimed at the identification of genes that play a key role in the process of mitosis. Between 2010 and 2015, he headed the follow-up project MitoSys, through which biologists, mathematicians, biochemists and biophysicists collaborated to reveal how genes and proteins orchestrate mitosis in human cells. This project was accompanied by an art project seeking to link science and society.

Awards and honours
 2016 European Research Council (ERC) Advanced Grant
 2014 Full Member of the Austrian Academy of Sciences (ÖAW)
 2012 Correspondent Member of the Austrian Academy of Sciences (ÖAW) 
 2011 Wittgenstein Award
 2007 Binder Innovation Prize of the German Society for Cell Biology
 2005 Boehringer Ingelheim R&D Award
 2002 Novartis Research Prize
 2002 Elected European Molecular Biology Organisation (EMBO) member
 2001 Roche Research Prize for Cell Biology
 2001 EMBO Young Investigator Programme
 1994 Falcon Prize German Society for Cell Biology
 1992 Scientific awards Junior Scientist Award, Society for Promotion of Molecular Biology
 1994–1996 EMBO long term postdoctoral fellowship
 1992–1993 Postdoctoral fellowship DKFZ
 1983–1988 Fellowships Student fellowship German National Scholarship Foundation

References

External links
 Lab Website of Jan-Michael Peters

1962 births
Living people
Scientists from Schleswig-Holstein
University of Kiel alumni
Heidelberg University alumni
German molecular biologists
European Research Council grantees
Members of the Austrian Academy of Sciences
Members of the European Molecular Biology Organization